The Tupi oil field (reverted from Lula oil field) is a large oil field located in the Santos Basin,  off the coast of Rio de Janeiro, Brazil. The field was originally nicknamed in honor of the Tupi people and later named after the mollusc, however it was also ambiguously similar to the name of former Brazilian president Luiz Inacio Lula da Silva. It is considered to be the Western Hemisphere's largest oil discovery of the last 30 years.

History

The Tupi field was discovered in October 2006 by Petrobras. The former president of Brazil, Luiz Inácio Lula da Silva called the field second independence for Brazil. The field was originally named Tupi but in 2010 it was renamed Lula. The name 'Lula' means squid in Portuguese but also refers to Luiz Inácio Lula da Silva.

In January 2008 Petrobras announced the discovery of the Jupiter field, a huge natural gas and condensate field which could equal the Tupi oil field in size.

Reservoir
The Tupi field is located in the  geological formation known as the Brazilian pre-salt layer, which lies below  of water and then  of salt, sand and rocks. The Tupi accumulation, in block BM-S-11 of the Santos basin, contains at least  of recoverable oil which could increase Brazil's reserves by 62%. This would make it twice the size of the Roncador, previously Brazil's largest field. The crude oil is an intermediate or medium gravity oil of 28–30 °API, which corresponds to a specific gravity around 0.88. The Tupi crude oil is considered sweet, which means that the sulfur content is less than 0.7% sulfur by weight.

Recent estimates have pushed the total to greater than  equivalent, though  Petrobras has not confirmed the highest estimate. These estimates are being put into severe doubt by impartial analysts.

Ownership
Block BM-S-11, which contains the Tupi field, is operated by Petrobras with a 65% controlling stake while BG Group holds 25% and Galp Energia has the remaining 10% interest.  According to Bear Stearns estimates, the value of the oil in the block ranges from $25 billion to $60 billion. BM-S-11 also includes Tupi Sul, Iara and Iracema fields.

Production
On April 22, 2009, BW Offshore and Petrobras let up the first crude oil from test well at Tupi field. The celebration ceremony for the beginning of production was held aboard the BW Cidade de Sao Vicente floating production, storage and offloading vessel (FPSO) on May 1, 2009. The president was expected to visit, but did not show up. The first producing well will provide output of  while the second well is expected to produce . The drilling of the first 15 wells has cost $1 billion. It is estimated that the total field cost will come to $50–$100 billion owing to the complexity of the geological formation. Up to 12 FPSOs may be needed for full production at Tupi. The field produces 100,000 barrels a day (January 2013).

See also

Iara oil field
Campos Basin
Iracema Oil Field

References

External links
Petrobras official site
Offshore Technology. Image—Section through Tupi field showing thick layers of salt

Oil fields of Brazil
Petrobras oil and gas fields
Galp Energia